Regional Hospital Wanica (Dutch: Regionaal Ziekenhuis Wanica) is a hospital in Lelydorp, Suriname. The hospital opened on 7 February 2020 in its initial stage, and serves the Wanica District. With 180 beds and 9 ICU beds, it will be a full-service hospital for the region without the need to go to Paramaribo. Antoine Elias, Minister of Health, reported that the radiology, laboratory, mortuary and emergency aid department were still under construction.

The construction of the hospital was sponsored by China who donated US$28 million. The government of Suriname spend SRD 120 million. The hospital is expected to have a staff of between 350 and 400 people when fully completed.

COVID-19 pandemic
Even though the Regional Hospital Wanica was still partially under construction, it was decided to the use the hospital to quarantine suspected COVID-19 patients, and as one of the locations for general quarantine. Antoine Joly, the eighth case of COVID-19 in Suriname whose condition was mild, was treated in the Regional Hospital Wanica between 24 and 29 March. On 5 April, the hospital was officially considered ready to handle COVID-19 patients at a specialised ward.

References

Hospitals in Suriname
Buildings and structures in Lelydorp